In architecture, a turret is a small tower that projects vertically from the wall of a building such as a medieval castle. Turrets were used to provide a projecting defensive position allowing covering fire to the adjacent wall in the days of military fortification. As their military use faded, turrets were used for decorative purposes, as in the Scottish baronial style.

A turret can have a circular top with crenellations as seen in the picture at right, a pointed roof, or other kind of apex. It might contain a staircase if it projects higher than the building; however, a turret is not necessarily higher than the rest of the building; in this case, it is typically part of a room, that can be simply walked into – see the turret of Chateau de Chaumont on the collection of turrets, which also illustrates a turret on a modern skyscraper.

A building may have both towers and turrets; towers might be smaller or higher, but turrets instead project from the edge of a building rather than continue to the ground. The size of a turret is therefore limited, since it puts additional stresses on the structure of the building. Turrets were traditionally supported by a corbel.

In modern times, a gun turret is a weapon mount that houses the crew or mechanism of a projectile-firing weapon, allowing the weapon to be aimed and fired in some degree of azimuth and elevation. It can be found on warships, combat vehicles, military aircraft, and land fortifications, and usually offers some degree of armour or protection.

Gallery

See also

 Bartizan, an overhanging, wall-mounted turret found particularly on French and Spanish fortifications between the early 14th and the 16th century. They returned to prominence in the 19th century with their popularity in Scottish baronial style.
 Bay window
 Oriel window
 Turret (Hadrian's Wall)

References

Architectural elements
Fortification (architectural elements)
Castle architecture